Plagiomima is a genus of bristle flies in the family Tachinidae.

Species
Plagiomima abdominalis Aldrich, 1926
Plagiomima alternata Aldrich, 1926
Plagiomima auriceps Aldrich, 1926
Plagiomima brevirostris Reinhard, 1962
Plagiomima cognata Aldrich, 1926
Plagiomima disparata Brauer & von Bergenstamm, 1891
Plagiomima euethes Reinhard, 1957
Plagiomima faceta Reinhard, 1957
Plagiomima haustellata Reinhard, 1944
Plagiomima incognita (Wulp, 1890)
Plagiomima rigidirostris (Wulp, 1890)
Plagiomima similis (Townsend, 1917)
Plagiomima spinosula (Bigot, 1889)

References

Tachinidae genera
Diptera of North America
Dexiinae
Taxa named by Friedrich Moritz Brauer
Taxa named by Julius von Bergenstamm